The "Great Escape" was a World War II mass escape from the German prisoner-of-war camp Stalag Luft III. It resulted in the murder of 50 recaptured escapees.

It was the basis of The Great Escape, a book by Paul Brickhill describing the escape and The Great Escape, a film based on the book.

Murdered

Survivors
In boldface, the three escapees who managed to reach freedom.

Notes

References 

Gre
Gre
 Great Escape
 Great Escape